Diego Monar Firmino Martins  (born 15 February 1989), commonly known as Diego Monar, is a Brazilian footballer who plays for Real Noroeste as a centre back.

Career

Born in São Vicente, São Paulo, Diego Monar joined Santos' youth academy in 2002, aged just thirteen.

On 20 February 2008, Diego Monar and Santos agreed to a contract extension that would see the player stay with the club until Fbebruay 2013.

Career statistics
(Correct )

References

External links
 Santos FC

1989 births
Living people
Brazilian footballers
Santos FC players
Association football defenders
Footballers from São Paulo (state)